The Platform Canvas is a conceptual framework dedicated to explain the mechanisms of multi-sided platform organizations, and how value is created, captured and delivered in the platform economy. Multi-sided platforms, also called two-sided markets, like Amazon, Uber and Airbnb, create value primarily by enabling direct interactions between distinct groups of affiliated customers. The framework serves as a strategic management tool to assist academics, entrepreneurs and managers identify the essential elements in platform businesses, understand the interrelations of these element and recognize the dynamics of associated network effects. The 12 components of the canvas highlight the internal and external factors of the business model, and the orchestration of the affiliated ecosystems.

The Platform Canvas is derived from the traditional Business Model Canvas first published in Business Model Generation: A Handbook For Visionaries, Game Changers, and Challengers by Osterwalder and Pigneur in 2010. The Business Model Canvas is widely acknowledged around the world by practitioners and academics. It represents the structure and components of a traditional linear business model, where value is produced upstream and consumed downstream, in a linear flow. The Platform Canvas, on the other hand, represents the structure, components and connections within multi-sided platform models, where value is created in the interaction among marketplace participants.

Description 
The Platform Canvas has 12 components; each element is named in the list below.  

 	Consumer Segments
 	Producer Segments
 	Consumer Value Propositions
 	Producer Value Propositions
 	Interaction
 	Facilitation
 	Consumer Substitutes
 	Producers Substitutes
 	Stimuli
 	Monetarization 
 	Cost Model
 	Metrics

History 
The framework of the Platform Canvas was first designed by Marcel Allweins in 2019, inspired by the earlier work of Dr. Ted Ladd on platform entrepreneurship. The final version of the canvas and its ideology was introduced in a conceptual paper, co-authored by Marcel Allweins, Markus Proesch and Ted Ladd and was first presented in January 2020 at the United States Association for Small Business and Entrepreneurship conference in New Orleans, Louisiana where it was awarded ‘Best Conceptual Paper’. The framework is published as a conceptual design and a work-in-template available in web-based formats via the official website.

References

External links 
 Official website
 Platform Canvas: Introduction Video, 5-minute video explaining the different elements of the canvas and dynamics between them

Framework Programmes